Butch may refer to:

People
 Butch (nickname), a list of people
Butch Cassidy's Wild Bunch, an Old West outlaw gang
Barbara Butch, French lesbian DJ and activist
 Butch Miller (wrestler) (born 1944), ring name of New Zealand professional wrestler Robert "Bob" Miller
 Butch Patrick, American child actor Patrick Alan Lilley (born 1953), best known for his role as Eddie Munster in The Munsters
 Butch, a ring name of British professional wrestler Pete Dunne (born Peter England)

Animals
 Butch, the second oldest (verified) dog ever, age 28
 Butch, one of the Tamworth Two, two pigs that escaped from an abattoir and caused a media frenzy in England

Arts, entertainment, and media
 Butch, the black haired member of The Rowdyruff Boys, a trio of the Powerpuff Girls' Male Versions in the animated series The Powerpuff Girls
 Butch and Cassidy, minor antagonists from the Pokémon anime series
 Butch the Bulldog, nemesis of Pluto's in Walt Disney cartoons
 Butch Cat, a black cat from the Tom and Jerry cartoons
 Tommy Bond, an Our Gang character nicknamed Butch
 Butch Cassidy, one of the main characters of the American Western film, Butch Cassidy and the Sundance Kid (1969)
 Butch Coolidge, a fictional character in the film Pulp Fiction
Butch (album), by The Geraldine Fibbers
 Butch DeLoria, Character in Fallout 3

Sexuality
 Butch, slang for someone very masculine, similar to macho
 Butch and femme, gender identity terms for butch lesbians and feminine lesbians
 Butch (lesbian slang), refers to a masculine lesbian and masculine lesbian culture
 Soft butch, or stem ("stud-fem"), a lesbian who exhibits stereotypical butch traits without fitting the masculine stereotype associated with butch lesbians
 Stone butch, a lesbian who displays the most traditional "masculine" characteristics without sexual reciprocity

Other uses
 Butch cut, a type of haircut

See also
Butchie
Butchie's Drive-In
The Butchies